The Karasu or Aswad is a river in the provinces of Gaziantep and Hatay in Turkey.  For part of its length it forms the border with Aleppo Governorate in Syria. It joins the Afrin River at the site of the former Lake Amik, and its waters now flow to the Orontes by a canal.

References

External links

Rivers of Turkey
Rivers of Syria
Syria–Turkey border
Aleppo Governorate
Landforms of Gaziantep Province
Landforms of Hatay Province
Orontes basin